Bezirk Hartberg is a former district of the state of Styria in Austria. Hartberg merged with the district of Fürstenfeld to form the new district Hartberg-Fürstenfeld on January 1, 2013.

Municipalities
Towns (Städte) are indicated in boldface; market towns (Marktgemeinden) in italics; suburbs, hamlets and other subdivisions of a municipality are indicated in small characters.
 Bad Waltersdorf
Hohenbrugg, Leitersdorf, Lichtenwald, Wagerberg
 Blaindorf
Hofing, Illensdorf
 Buch-Geiseldorf
Geiseldorf, Oberbuch, Unterbuch, Unterdombach
 Dechantskirchen
Bergen, Burgfeld, Hohenau am Wechsel, Kroisbach, Stögersbach
 Dienersdorf
 Ebersdorf
Nörning, Wagenbach
 Eichberg 
 Friedberg
Friedberg, Ehrenschachen, Maierhöfen, Oberwaldbauern, Ortgraben, Schwaighof, Stögersbach
 Grafendorf bei Hartberg
Erdwegen, Kleinlungitz, Lechen, Obersafen, Reibersdorf, Seibersdorf am Hammerwald, Untersafen
 Greinbach
Penzendorf, Staudach, Wolfgrub
 Großhart
Neusiedl
 Hartberg
Eggendorf, Habersdorf, Ring, Safenau
 Hartberg Umgebung
Flattendorf, Löffelbach, Mitterdombach, Schildbach, Siebenbrunn, Wenireith
 Hartl
 Hofkirchen bei Hartberg
 Kaibing
 Kaindorf
Kopfing bei Kaindorf, Kleinschlag, Lebing, Schnellerviertel
 Lafnitz
Oberlungitz, Wagendorf
 Limbach bei Neudau
Oberlimbach, Unterlimbach
 Mönichwald
Karnerviertel, Schmiedviertel
 Neudau
 Pinggau
Baumgarten, Dirnegg, Haideggendorf, Koglreith, Rosenbichl, Pichlhöf, Schaueregg, Sinnersdorf, Sparberegg, Steirisch-Tauchen, Tanzegg, Wiesenhöf
 Pöllau
 Pöllauberg
Oberneuberg, Unterneuberg, Zeil bei Pöllau
 Puchegg
 Rabenwald
 Riegersberg
Reinberg, Riegersbach
 Rohr bei Hartberg
Oberrohr, Unterrohr
 Rohrbach an der Lafnitz
 Saifen-Boden
Obersaifen, Winkl-Boden
 Sankt Jakob im Walde
Filzmoos, Kaltenegg, Kirchenviertel, Steinhöf
 Sankt Johann bei Herberstein
 Sankt Johann in der Haide
Schölbing, Unterlungitz
 Sankt Lorenzen am Wechsel
Auerbach, Festenburg, Köppel, Kronegg, Riegl
 Sankt Magdalena am Lemberg
Hopfau, Längenbach, Lemberg, Mitterndorf, Weinberg
 Schachen bei Vorau
 Schäffern
Anger, Elsenau, Elsenau Sparberegg, Götzendorf, Guggendorf, Haberl, Knolln, Spital
 Schlag bei Thalberg
Limbach, Rohrbachschlag
 Schönegg bei Pöllau
Hinteregg, Schönau, Winzendorf
 Sebersdorf
Geier, Neustift bei Sebersdorf, Rohrbach bei Waltersdorf
 Siegersdorf bei Herberstein
 Sonnhofen
Köppelreith, Prätis
 Stambach
Pongratzen, Zeilerviertel
 Stubenberg
Buchberg bei Herberstein, Freienberg, Stubenberg am See, Vockenberg, Zeil bei Stubenberg
 Tiefenbach bei Kaindorf
Obertiefenbach, Untertiefenbach
 Vorau
 Vornholz
 Waldbach
Arzberg, Breitenbrunn, Rieglerviertel, Schrimpf
 Wenigzell
Kandlbauer, Pittermannviertl, Sichart, Sommersgut
 Wörth an der Lafnitz

Districts of Styria
States and territories disestablished in 2013
Hartberg-Fürstenfeld District